"Take Me" is a song by Australian alternative dance group Rüfüs. The song was released on 8 March 2013 as the lead single from the group's debut studio album, Atlas (2013). The song debuted at number 87 in April 2013 and peaked at number 61 in March 2014. The song was certified platinum in Australia in 2018.

At the 2013 Australian Independent Record Labels Association Awards, the song was nominated for Best Independent Dance/Electronica or Club Single.

Reception
Your EDM said ""Take Me" is a flawless fusion of deep and tropical house. Filled to brim with infectious melodies and bouncy chords, "Take Me" will undoubtedly leave you longing for sunshine, ocean breezes and all things summer."

Music video
The music video was directed by Katzki and released on 6 March 2013.

Track listing

Charts

Certifications

Release history

References

2013 songs
2013 singles
Rüfüs Du Sol songs